The following is a list of reggae rock artists. Reggae rock is a subgenre of reggae fusion that primarily uses the genres reggae, rock and ska.

Artists

311
Ballyhoo!
Bedouin Soundclash
Big Mountain
Big Sugar
Colle´ Kharis
Tessanne Chin
Dag Vag
Dirty Heads
Dread Zeppelin
Echo Movement
The Expendables
IllScarlett
Iration
Lionize
Magic!
Matisyahu
Men at Work
The Movement
No Fixed Address
Os Paralamas do Sucesso (a.k.a. Paralamas)
Passafire
Pepper
The Police
Natty Nation
Rebelution
Skank
Skindred
Slightly Stoopid
SOJA
State Radio
Sublime
Subrosa Union
Tomorrows Bad Seeds
Tribal Seeds
Us Mob
Bart Willoughby

References